The Iowa Animal Industry Bureau is the governmental agency in the state of Iowa, United States, that regulates livestock health and livestock identification.  Administratively it is under the Iowa Department of Agriculture and Land Stewardship and its director is the State Veterinarian. The bureau also administratively supports the Iowa Board of Veterinary Medicine.

Livestock identification
All brands for livestock used in Iowa must be registered. For the purpose of branding, livestock is defined as horses, cattle, sheep, mules, or asses (donkeys).  Iowa provides electronic access to all registered brands.

Livestock health
The Iowa Animal Industry Bureau maintains health programs for the following diseases:
 Avian influenza
 Bovine spongiform encephalopathy (BSE) detection
 Brucellosis and Tuberculosis Eradication
 Chronic wasting disease (CWD)
 Contagious equine metritis (CEM)
 Exotic Newcastle disease (END), a poultry disease
 Foot-and-mouth disease
 Johne's disease
 Pseudorabies
 Scrapie
 West Nile virus

In addition the bureau establishes the health requirements for the exhibition of livestock, poultry and birds at county fairs, the State Fair and district shows.

Notes and references

External links
"Animal Industry Bureau" Official State of Iowa website.

Animal Industry Bureau, Iowa
Veterinary organizations
Veterinary medicine in the United States